"Come See Me" (aka "I'm Your Man") is a 1966 song by Pretty Things on Fontana Records. It was written by J.J. Jackson, Pierre Tubbs and Sidney Barnes. The song charted in UK and Netherlands.

The B-side was a concert favorite "£.s.d", featuring the chorus lyrics "yes I need L.S.D." The title was a play on abbreviations for pounds, shillings and pence; Phil May would admit later that the song was about LSD. The song was reissued titled as "LSD" on the CD reissue of the album Get the Picture?. The song was covered by UK garage punk band the Cannibals in 1983.

References

1966 singles
Pretty Things songs
British garage rock songs
Song recordings produced by Glyn Johns
Songs written by Pierre Tubbs
1966 songs
Fontana Records singles